South Africa operates three Lillian Ngoyi-class environmental patrol vessels,
based on the Damen Stan 4708 design.

The vessels were constructed in South Africa by Farocean Marine.
The United States Coast Guard later decided to acquire up to 58   fast response cutters (FRC), also based on the Damen Stan patrol vessel 4708 design, citing the success of the South African vessels.

References

Patrol vessels of South Africa
Patrol boat classes